This is a list of Somerset List A cricket records; that is, record team and individual performances in List A cricket for Somerset County Cricket Club.

Team
 Highest Total For: 413/4 v Devon at Recreation Ground, Torquay, 1990
 Highest Total Against: 429/9 by Nottinghamshire at Taunton, 2017
 Lowest Total For: 58 v Essex at Chelmsford, 1977 & 58 v Middlesex at John Walker's Ground, Southgate, 2000
 Lowest Total Against: 60 by Kent at Taunton, 1979

Batting
 Highest Score: 184 Marcus Trescothick v Gloucestershire, Taunton, 2008
 Most Runs in Season: 1331 Jimmy Cook, 1990

Most List A runs for Somerset
Qualification - 5000 runs

Highest Partnership for each wicket

Bowling
 Best Bowling: 8/66 Simon Francis v Derbyshire at County Ground, Derby, 2004
 Wickets in Season: 51, Bob Clapp, 1974

Most List A wickets for Somerset
Qualification - 300 wickets

See also
 List of Somerset first-class cricket records
 List of Somerset Twenty20 cricket records

References

Somerset County Cricket Club
Somerset
Cricket